This is a list of the 13 episodes of series three of Frontline, which aired in 1997. In the third and final season, the show-within-the-show becomes the most respected and well-rated current affairs program in Australia however the politics and manipulations behind the scenes remain the same.

All of the show's episodes were written and directed by Rob Sitch (Mike Moore), Jane Kennedy (Brooke Vandenberg), Santo Cilauro (Geoffrey Salter) – who also did most of the camera work – and Tom Gleisner.

Cast

Main
 Steve Bisley as Graham "Prowsey" Prowse, executive producer of Frontline
 Rob Sitch as Mike Moore, Frontline'''s anchor
 Tiriel Mora as Martin di Stasio, reporter
 Alison Whyte as Emma Ward, the show's producer
 Jane Kennedy as Brooke Vandenberg, reporter
 Anita Cerdic as Domenica Baroni, receptionist
 Santo Cilauro as Geoffrey Salter, weatherman
 Boris Conley as Elliot Rhodes, Frontline'''s "Friday Night Funnyman" (11 episodes)
 Trudy Hellier as Kate Preston, segment producer (10 episodes)
 Pip Mushin as Stu O'Halloran, cameraman (12 episodes)
 Torquil Neilson as Jason Cotter, sound recorder (7 episodes)
 Linda Ross as Shelley Cohen, executive assistant to Prowsey

Recurring
 Lynda Gibson as Trish, network Head of Publicity (7 episodes)
 Stephen Curry as Trev, sound recorder (6 episodes)
 Marcus Eyre as Hugh Tabbagh, editor (3 episodes)
 Peter Stratford as Bob Cavell, Managing Director of the network (2 episodes)
 Eung Aun Khor as Khor, cleaner (1 episode)

Episodes

References

External links
 Frontline website (Extremely out of date circa 1997)
 Interview with Rob Sitch on the tenth anniversary of Frontline
 Frontline DVDs at the ABC shop online

1997 Australian television seasons